Luan Viana Patrocínio (born 14 January 1996), sometimes known simply as Luan, is a Brazilian professional footballer who plays as a forward for Mixto.

Club career
Born in São Paulo, Luan Viana graduated from Portuguesa's youth setup, and made his first-team debut on 13 February 2013, coming on as a late substitute in a 2–0 win at São José, for the Campeonato Paulista Série A2 championship.

On 8 August, Luan Viana was definitely promoted to the main squad in Série A. However, he failed to appear during the rest of the year.

On 26 April 2014 Luan Viana made his league debut for Lusa, playing the last 19 minutes of a 1–1 home draw against Santa Cruz, for the Série B championship. He scored his first professional goal on 8 November, netting the game's only through a header in a 1–0 home win over Luverdense, as his side were already relegated to Série C.

On 9 January 2015 Luan Viana left the club, after having unpaid wages. He joined Grêmio in March, returning to youth setup.

On 6 September 2018 Luan Viana signed a longterm contract with the Bulgarian 26 times champions Levski Sofia   After failing to make it into the first team in the first half of the season, in January 2019 he was sent on loan to the Second League leaders Tsarsko Selo. He scored 2 goals in a friendly match against the Macedonian team FK Belasica played on 5 February. After spending first 3 matches from the league on the bench, Luan made his debut for the team in the league match against Chernomorets Balchik and scored a goal for the 3:1 win.

Honours
International
Toulon Tournament: 2013

References

External links
Luan Viana at playmakerstats.com (English version of ogol.com.br)

Luan Viana at ZeroZero

1996 births
Living people
Brazilian footballers
Brazilian expatriate footballers
Association football forwards
Footballers from São Paulo
Campeonato Brasileiro Série B players
First Professional Football League (Bulgaria) players
Associação Portuguesa de Desportos players
Grêmio Foot-Ball Porto Alegrense players
Shabab Al-Ahli Club players
Paraná Clube players
PFC Levski Sofia players
FC Tsarsko Selo Sofia players
CE Operário Várzea-Grandense players
Nova Iguaçu Futebol Clube players
Mixto Esporte Clube players
Brazilian expatriate sportspeople in the United Arab Emirates
Brazilian expatriate sportspeople in Bulgaria
Expatriate footballers in Bulgaria
Expatriate footballers in the United Arab Emirates